Kassler or Kasseler in German cuisine is the name given to a cured and slightly smoked cut of pork similar to gammon. It can be either hot or cold smoked. Pork necks and loins are the most often used cuts although ribs, shoulders and bellies can also be used. It is often served either with sauerkraut and mashed potatoes or with kale and roasted potatoes.

In addition to pork, chicken prepared 'Kasseler' style is available at some butchers.

It is unclear where the name comes from. It is often said that the name derived from a Berlin-based butcher called Cassel who prepared the cut in the late 19th century. However, records of the town's inhabitants show that in the 19th century no butcher named Cassel or Kassel was living in Berlin. Likewise, it is not possible to prove that Kasseler comes from the German town Kassel.

In Finland, pork neck of any type is called kassler.

A similar dish, hamburgerryg, is eaten in Denmark. In this variation the meat is boiled. It is often served with a glace of either honey or mustard. In Norway, hamburgerrygg is smoked, while the unsmoked variant is called benfri svinekam. In Iceland, hamborgarhryggur is a traditional Christmas dinner.

Also a similar dish, baleron, is eaten in Poland.

See also

 List of smoked foods

References

German cuisine
Pork
German words and phrases
Berlin cuisine
Smoked meat